Ardisia pulverulenta is a species of plant in the family Primulaceae. It is found in Guatemala, Honduras, and Panama.

References

pulverulenta
Least concern plants
Taxonomy articles created by Polbot